József Kiss (30 November 1843, Mezőcsát - 31 December 1921, Budapest) was a Hungarian poet and editor.

Biography
Kiss was born in Mezőcsát. His father, István Klein, was a poor Jewish shopkeeper. His mother was the daughter of a Jewish-Lithuanian teacher who had fled the pogroms. In 1850, the family moved to Gömör és Kishont County, where his father became a Royal tenant farmer. Soon, his parents decided that he should be a rabbi and sent him to study in Miskolc.

In 1856, at the age of thirteen, he fled to Vienna. In 1862, when he was 19, his mother died and, around the same time, his father's business failed. Kiss was forced to give up his studies and subsequently spent several years as an itinerant Hebrew teacher, in the cities of the Great Hungarian Plain. In 1867, the year that Jewish emancipation was reproclaimed, with the establishment of the constitutional monarchy of Austria-Hungary, he went to Pest and unsuccessfully appealed to the Jewish community there to support the publication of his first book of poems. He published the volume privately, as Zsidó dalok (Jewish Poems); however, it failed to gain notice. 

He then took work as a proofreader at the Deutsch publishing house. In 1873, he married a distant relative. The following year, he became seriously ill and wrote his novel, Budapesti rejtelmek (Secrets of Budapest) while bedridden. His first success came in 1875 with his long ballad-poem, which was presented at a meeting of the Kisfaludy Society by Ferenc Toldy. As his popularity grew, so did the controversies surrounding his point of view. The journalist, Jenő Rákosi, was an especially harsh critic. Kiss also translated many of the Psalms into modern language with a contemporary perspective; he had to publish these himself due to dogmatic criticisms. 

Since 1882, he had supported his literary activities by working for a French-Hungarian insurance company. When the company failed in 1889, he returned to his editing work and, in 1890, created , a social and literary bulletin. In 1914, he became a member of the Kisfaludy Society.

References

Sources
 Biography @ MEK
 Biography @ the Magyar Zsidó Lexikon
 The Week (A Hét) @ Epika

External links
 Válogatott versei (Selected poems) @ MEK
 Ünnepnapok (Holidays) @ MEK
 The Week, 21 January 1906, with his poem A KNYÁZ POTEMKIN, inspired by the 1905 Russian Revolution
 Simon Judit (1915 film) @ IMDb

1843 births
1921 deaths
Hungarian male poets
Hungarian editors
Hungarian Jews
Jewish poets
People from Borsod-Abaúj-Zemplén County
19th-century Hungarian poets
19th-century Hungarian male writers
20th-century Hungarian poets
20th-century Hungarian male writers